Easter Road railway station was a railway station located on the street of Easter Road in Edinburgh, Scotland from 1891 to 1947 built by the North British Railway.

History
The station closed in 1947. Part of the line from Piershill remained in use to serve the waste consolidation depot at Powderhall which remained in use until it closed in 2016. Both platforms still remain in place.

References

External links

Disused railway stations in Edinburgh
Railway stations in Great Britain opened in 1891
Railway stations in Great Britain closed in 1917
Railway stations in Great Britain opened in 1919
Railway stations in Great Britain closed in 1947
1891 establishments in Scotland
1947 disestablishments in Scotland
Former North British Railway stations